The Thule Society, originally the  ("Study Group for Germanic Antiquity"), was a German occultist and  group founded in Munich shortly after World War I, named after a mythical northern country in Greek legend. According to Hitler biographer Ian Kershaw, the organization's "membership list ... reads like a Who's Who of early Nazi sympathizers and leading figures in Munich", including Rudolf Hess, Alfred Rosenberg, Hans Frank, Julius Lehmann, Gottfried Feder, Dietrich Eckart, and Karl Harrer.

Author Nicholas Goodrick-Clarke contends that Hans Frank and Rudolf Hess had been Thule members, but other leading Nazis had only been invited to speak at Thule meetings or they were entirely unconnected with it. According to Johannes Hering, "There is no evidence that Hitler ever attended the Thule Society."

Origins
The Thule Society was originally a "German study group" headed by Walter Nauhaus, a wounded World War I veteran turned art student from Berlin who had become a keeper of pedigrees for the Germanenorden (or "Order of Teutons"), a secret society founded in 1911 and formally named in the following year. In 1917, Nauhaus moved to Munich; his Thule Society was to be a cover-name for the Munich branch of the Germanenorden, but events developed differently as a result of a schism in the Order. In 1918, Nauhaus was contacted in Munich by Rudolf von Sebottendorf (or von Sebottendorff), an occultist and newly elected head of the Bavarian province of the schismatic offshoot known as the Germanenorden Walvater of the Holy Grail. The two men became associates in a recruitment campaign, and Sebottendorff adopted Nauhaus's Thule Society as a cover-name for his Munich lodge of the Germanenorden Walvater at its formal dedication on 18 August 1918.

Beliefs
A primary focus of the Thule Society was a claim concerning the origins of the Aryan race. In 1917, people who wanted to join the "Germanic Order", out of which the Thule Society developed in 1918, had to sign a special "blood declaration of faith" concerning their lineage:

The signer hereby swears to the best of his knowledge and belief that no Jewish or coloured blood flows in either his or in his wife's veins, and that among their ancestors are no members of the coloured races.

"Thule" was a land located by Greco-Roman geographers in the farthest north (often displayed as Iceland). The Latin term "Ultima Thule" is also mentioned by Roman poet Virgil in his pastoral poems called the Georgics. Thule originally was probably the name for Scandinavia, although Virgil simply uses it as a proverbial expression for the edge of the known world, and his mention should not be taken as a substantial reference to Scandinavia. The Thule Society identified Ultima Thule as a lost ancient landmass in the extreme north, near Greenland or Iceland, said by Nazi mystics to be the capital of ancient Hyperborea.

Activities
The Thule Society attracted about 250 followers in Munich and about 1,500 elsewhere in Bavaria.

The followers of the Thule Society were very interested in racial theory and, in particular, in combating Jews and Communists. Sebottendorff planned but failed to kidnap Bavarian socialist prime minister Kurt Eisner in December 1918. During the Bavarian revolution of April 1919, Thulists were accused of trying to infiltrate its government and of attempting a coup. On 26 April, the Communist government in Munich raided the society's premises and took seven of its members into custody, executing them on 30 April. Amongst them were Walter Nauhaus and four well-known aristocrats, including Countess Heila von Westarp who functioned as the group's secretary, and Prince Gustav of Thurn and Taxis who was related to several European royal families. In response, the Thule organised a citizens' uprising as White troops entered the city on 1 May.

Münchener Beobachter newspaper
In 1918, the Thule Society bought a local weekly newspaper, the Münchener Beobachter (Munich Observer), and changed its name to Münchener Beobachter und Sportblatt (Munich Observer and Sports Paper) in an attempt to improve its circulation. The Münchener Beobachter later became the Völkischer Beobachter ("Völkisch Observer"), the main Nazi newspaper. It was edited by Karl Harrer.

Deutsche Arbeiterpartei
Anton Drexler had developed links between the Thule Society and various extreme right workers' organizations in Munich. He established the Deutsche Arbeiterpartei (DAP; German Workers' Party) on 5 January 1919, together with the Thule Society's Karl Harrer. Adolf Hitler joined this party in September the same year. By the end of February 1920, the DAP had been reconstituted as the Nationalsozialistische Deutsche Arbeiterpartei (NSDAP; National Socialist German Workers' Party), often referred to as the Nazi Party.

Sebottendorff by then had left the Thule Society, and never joined the DAP or the Nazi Party. Dietrich Bronder (Bevor Hitler kam, 1964) alleged that other members of the Thule Society were later prominent in Nazi Germany: the list includes Dietrich Eckart (who coached Hitler on his public speaking skills, along with Erik Jan Hanussen, and had Mein Kampf dedicated to him), as well as Gottfried Feder, Hans Frank, Hermann Göring, Karl Haushofer, Rudolf Hess, Heinrich Himmler, and Alfred Rosenberg. Historian Nicholas Goodrick-Clarke has described this membership role and similar claims as "spurious" and "fanciful", noting that Feder, Eckart, and Rosenberg were never more than guests to whom the Thule Society extended hospitality during the Bavarian revolution of 1918, although he has more recently acknowledged that Hess and Frank were members of the society before they came to prominence in the Nazi Party. It has also been claimed that Adolf Hitler himself was a member. Evidence on the contrary shows that he never attended a meeting, as attested to by Johannes Hering's diary of society meetings. It is quite clear that Hitler himself had little interest in, and made little time for, "esoteric" matters. (See also Hitler's Nuremberg speech of 6 September 1938 on his disapproval of occultism.)

Wilhelm Laforce and Max Sesselmann (staff on the Münchener Beobachter) were Thule members who later joined the NSDAP.

Dissolution
Early in 1920, Karl Harrer was forced out of the DAP as Hitler moved to sever the party's link with the Thule Society, which subsequently fell into decline and was dissolved about five years later, well before Hitler came to power.

Rudolf von Sebottendorff had withdrawn from the Thule Society in 1919, but he returned to Germany in 1933 in the hope of reviving it.  In that year, he published a book entitled Bevor Hitler kam (Before Hitler Came), in which he claimed that the Thule Society had paved the way for the Führer: "Thulers were the ones to whom Hitler first came, and Thulers were the first to unite themselves with Hitler."  This claim was not favourably received by the Nazi authorities: after 1933, esoteric organisations were suppressed (including völkisch occultists), many closed down by anti-Masonic legislation in 1935.  Sebottendorff's book was prohibited and he himself was arrested and imprisoned for a short period in 1934, afterwards departing into exile in Turkey.

Nonetheless, it has been argued that some Thule members and their ideas were incorporated into Nazi Germany.  Some of the Thule Society's teachings were expressed in the books of Alfred Rosenberg. Many occult ideas found favour with Heinrich Himmler, who had a great interest in mysticism, unlike Hitler, but the Schutzstaffel (SS) under Himmler emulated the structure of Ignatius Loyola's Jesuit order rather than the Thule Society, according to Hohne.

Conspiracy theories
The Thule Society has become the center of many conspiracy theories concerning Nazi Germany, due to its occult background (like the Ahnenerbe section of the SS). Such theories include the creation of vril-powered Nazi UFOs.

In popular culture

In popular culture, references to the Thule Society have included the 2013 season 8 episode "Everybody Hates Hitler" of The CW series Supernatural, in which a group of society members seek out a lost ledger containing information about their experiments with necromancy. In the 2016 season 11 episode "The Vessel", a leading member of the Thule Society vies against Dean to find a piece of the Ark of the Covenant during World War II. In the season 12 episode "The One You've Been Waiting For", the Thule leadership endeavors to resurrect Adolf Hitler, resulting in the death of both the leadership of the Thule Society and the resurrected Hitler.

The Thule Society plays a major role in the Fullmetal Alchemist: The Conqueror of Shamballa, a movie set after the ending of the 2003 anime of the same name.

In Hellboy, the Thule Society was responsible for conducting a doomsday ritual that caused the titular hero to appear in our world with the aid of Grigori Rasputin. In the 2004 film adaptation, Professor Bruttenholm refers to Adolf Hitler having joined the Thule Society in 1937, describing them as "a group of German aristocrats obsessed with the occult."

The Thule Society is referenced in several of Charles Stross's Laundry Files novels and short stories.

In the Area 51 novels, the society is mentioned as being the occult force behind the Nazi Party.

The Thule Society plays a major part in the Wolfenstein video game series.

In the Secret World Chronicle by Mercedes Lackey, the Thule Society is behind the attacks on Echo facilities on February 15, 2004.

The Thule Society is featured in the video game Clive Barker's Jericho.

The fictional "Brotherhood of Thule" is featured as the American branch of the Thule Society in the 1998 video game Black Dahlia.

The Thule Society plays a role in the Marvel Comics series, Fear Itself. In the story, the Thule Society is under the guidance and leadership of the Red Skull, which he uses to protect the Hammer of Skadi when it is summoned to the earth.

The Thule Society also appears in Steve Gerber's brief run on Marvel's Cloak and Dagger.

The Loyalists of Thule, a group dedicated to the hunt for supernatural creatures, are based on the remnants of the Thule Society in Hunter: The Vigil by White Wolf Publishing

The Thule Society is present in the eroge/anime 11eyes as a hermetic society of dark magic practitioners aiding Nazi Germany in its war against the Vatican.

The Thule Society is at the center of a conspiracy which is the subject of the Serbian 2017 TV series Senke nad Balkanom ("Shadows over the Balkans"), set in the interwar Kingdom of Yugoslavia.

In Prisoners, detective Loki who inspects the disappearance of abducted children wears a ring that bears the logo of the Thule Society. The logo appears again in the form of maze drawings on a wall in a scene.

See also
Ahnenerbe
Guido von List
Nazi archaeology
Nazism and occultism
Thule-Seminar

References

Bibliography
 
 
 Goodrick-Clarke, Nicholas. 2002. Black Sun: Aryan Cults, Esoteric Nazism and the Politics of Identity. New York University Press. . (Paperback 2003, 384 pages, .)
 
 
 Jacob, Frank. 2010. Die Thule-Gesellschaft. Uni-edition. 
 Jacob, Frank: Die Thule-Gesellschaft und die Kokuryûkai: Geheimgesellschaften im global-historischen Vergleich, Königshausen & Neumann, Würzburg, 2012,

Further reading
 Gilbhard, Hermann. 1994. Die Thule-Gesellschaft. Kiessling Verlag. . 
 Hale, Christopher. 2003. Himmler's Crusade: The True Story of the 1938 Nazi Expedition into Tibet. London: Transworld Publishers. .
 Kershaw, Ian. 2001. Hitler 1889–1936: Hubris. Penguin. .
 Lavenda, Peter. 2007. Unholy Alliance. Continium Books. .
 (fr) Jean Robin, Hitler, l'élu du dragon, Camion Noir, .
 Sklar, Dusty. 1977. The Nazis and the Occult. New York: Dorset Press. .

1918 establishments in Germany
Organizations established in 1918
Occultism in Nazism
Germanic mysticism
Pseudoarchaeology
Pseudohistory
Secret societies in Germany